Shrewsbury is a census-designated place (CDP) and unincorporated community in Kanawha County, West Virginia, United States. Shrewsbury is located on the north bank of the Kanawha River along U.S. Route 60. As of the 2010 census, its population was 652.

Like the nearby community of Dickinson, Shrewsbury was given its name due to the early history of the Dickinson and Shrewsbury families within the area.

Shrewsbury is home to a Liberty gas station and convenience store, the Mason-Dixon Bar, and three churches; The Shrewsbury Church of God, Shrewsbury Community Church and the Shrewsbury Baptist Church.

References

Census-designated places in Kanawha County, West Virginia
Census-designated places in West Virginia
Populated places on the Kanawha River